"Love Is a War" is a song written by Jamie Appleby, Melinda Appleby, Melinda Jackson and Elliot Gleave, and produced by Ash for the Rogue Traders's upcoming fourth studio album. It was as released as the album's first single in Australia as a digital download on 25 December 2009 and as a CD single on 8 January 2010. This is the first single with new lead singer Mindi Jackson. The track features English singer/rapper Example.

Formats and track listings

Formats and track listings of the major single releases of "Love Is a War" include: 

Australian digital download
(Released 25 December 2009)
 "Love Is a War" – 3:26
 "Love Is a War" (James Ash 'Bitch Dragon' Remix) – 5:56
 "Love Is a War" (Denzal Park Dub) – 6:25
 "I'll Be Your Stalker" – 4:17

Australian CD single / UK Digital download
(88697616112; Released 8 January 2010)
 "Love Is a War" – 3:29
 "Love Is a War" (James Ash 'Bitch Dragon' Remix) – 5:58
 "Love Is a War" (Denzal Park Dub) – 6:26

Charts

Release history

References

2009 singles
Rogue Traders songs
Songs written by James Ash
Songs written by Example (musician)